Freetown station is a future MBTA Commuter Rail station located in the Assonet village of Freetown, Massachusetts. It is planned to open in 2023 as part of the first phase of the South Coast Rail project. The station will has a single side platform on the west side of the Fall River Secondary, along with a park and ride lot.

The Fall River Railroad opened through Freetown in 1845. Two stations on the line in Freetown were open until the 1930s. Freetown was announced as a potential South Coast Rail station in 2009. The planned station site was relocated slightly to the northeast in 2018. A construction contract was issued in 2020, and the station was substantially completed in December 2022.

Station design
Freetown station will be located in the southwestern part of the Assonet village in Freetown between the South Main Street and the Route Massachusetts Route 24/79 expressway. It will have a single -long high-level side platform on the west side of the single main track of the Fall River Secondary. A freight passing siding will be located on the east side of the main track. A 107-space park and ride lot with a kiss-and-ride lane will be located next to the platform, with a driveway to South Main Street. A canopy will cover the portion of the platform adjacent to the entrance from the parking lot, with smaller canopies near the ends of the platform.

History

Previous stations

The Fall River Railroad opened from Myricks to Fall River in June 1845, and to South Braintree in December 1846. Two stations were located on the line in Freetown: Assonet at Elm Street, and Crystal Spring (Thwaites) at Copicut Road. Somerset Junction (Millers), the junction with the 1866-opened Dighton and Somerset Railroad, was located further to the south in northern Fall River near the Freetown border. Service was consolidated in 1854 under the Old Colony and Fall River Railroad (later the Old Colony Railroad); the Old Colony was leased to the New Haven Railroad in 1893.

Passenger service on the line continued until September 5, 1958, except for a discontinuance from 1949 to 1952. However, most local stops including Assonet, Crystal Spring, and Somerset Junction were discontinued by the 1930s; by the end of service, trains ran nonstop from Fall River to Taunton. The line continued to be used for freight service by the New Haven and its successors Penn Central and Conrail, then finally as the CSX Fall River Subdivision.

South Coast Rail

In September 2008, MassDOT released 18 potential station sites for the South Coast Rail project, including a Freetown station off South Main Street near the Route 24/79 expressway. A 2009 conceptual design called for a single side platform serving one track, with a second track allowing freight trains to pass the high-level platform. The station was planned to be the anchor of Assonet Village, a new mixed-use transit-oriented development village. Station plans released as part of the Final Environmental Impact Report in 2013 were nearly identical to the 2009 plans. On June 11, 2010, the state took ownership of the Fall River Subdivision (renamed the Fall River Secondary) and several other CSX lines as part of a sale agreement.

In 2017, the project was re-evaluated due to cost issues. A new proposal released in March 2017 called for early service via Middleborough by 2024, followed by full service via Stoughton by 2029. Freetown would have only been built as an infill station during the second phase. By mid-2017, plans called for the first phase to be completed in 2022, and to include stations at Freetown and Battleship Cove in Phase 1 rather than Phase 2.

The MBTA awarded a $159 million contract for construction of the Fall River Secondary portion of the project, including Freetown station, in May 2020. Service was then planned to begin in November 2023. The station was 27% complete by February 2022, with 82% of platform foundations complete. Substantial completion of the Fall River Secondary work was announced at an event at Freetown station in December 2022, with revenue service still planned for late 2023.

References

External links

Freetown, Massachusetts
Under-construction MBTA Commuter Rail stations
MBTA Commuter Rail stations in Bristol County, Massachusetts
Railway stations scheduled to open in 2023